The Sail and Life Training Society (SALTS), founded in 1974, is a non-profit Christian organization based in Victoria, British Columbia. SALTS provides sail training and life lessons for 1,700 young people each year on tall ships and provides a valued link to the area's maritime heritage.  Currently, SALTS administrative offices are located on Herald Street in downtown Victoria, with a shop space located nearby in the Rock Bay area.

Programs 
Young people ages 13–25 are given the experience of learning to sail a tall ship, which the organization describes as "life-changing." In addition to learning a large set of sailing skills, they face fears (for example when climbing the rigging 115’ in the air on a moving ship) and learn teamwork, responsibility and interpersonal skills, which results in increased confidence.> A bursary program is offered with help from other group partners, to make the program affordable to young people who are at risk, in low income households, or experiencing challenging life situations.

In the spring and fall, 4- and 5-day group sails are made with school and community groups. Ship Point Wharf in Victoria, British Columbia is the start and end point to the trips that travel through the Gulf Islands. 10-day summer sails circumnavigate Vancouver Island, sail along the central coast of British Columbia and the Great Bear Rainforest, and explore Haida Gwaii.

In the past, offshore voyages to ports around the world were held, where youth participated in selected legs of the journey. Due to new Canadian regulations for offshore vessels which the current tall ships do not meet, these trips are on hold until a new schooner is completed. All progress on the New Schooner Project can be followed along on their website.

Group programs are offered with over 30 public and private schools, university programs, and youth groups bringing 20 - 30 young people and their adult chaperones.

Day sails are also made available to interested sailors of all ages.

Fundraising
SALTS is a registered Canadian charity. A large portion of program costs are funded through boat donations. SALTS arranges a third-party appraisal for the value of the tax receipt issued, and handles moorage, transportation and broker's fees.

A major campaign is underway for the capital cost of a new 116' Pilot Schooner. As of April 2019, approximately $3 million remains in the fund balance.

Ships 

SALTS owns, maintains and operates two traditional tall ships, Pacific Swift and Pacific Grace. Both were built by the Society in a shipyard at the former Coast Guard base on Victoria's Upper Harbour. A new 116' Pilot Schooner is being custom designed, and as of April 2019, approximately $3 million remains in the fund balance.

Pacific Swift 

The wood hull of Pacific Swift was built as a working exhibit at Expo 86 in Vancouver, British Columbia.  She is based on the brigantine Swift of 1778.  The society had built another brigantine, Spirit of Chemainus, in 1985.  Pacific Swift has made four off-shore voyages, which have included visits to Expo 88 in Australia and Expo 92 in Seville, to the West Indies and to the remote communities of Easter Island and Pitcairn Island. Pacific Swift has a total sail area of 510 sq m and weighs 71.45 gross tons.

Pacific Grace 

Pacific Grace was built at the S.A.L.T.S. Heritage Shipyard in Victoria, launched in October 1999 and commissioned in May 2001. Her total sail area is 740 sq m. and weighs a total of 94 gross tons. She is based on the Grand Banks fishing schooner Robertson II, one of the last fishing vessels to have been built in Canada which the society operated from 1974 to 1995.  After two seasons of coastal sailing, she departed in September 2003 on her first offshore voyage: down the coast to Costa Rica, west to Galapagos and Pitcairn, and back through the Marquesas and the Hawaiian Islands. From June 2007 to June 2008, she made a longer voyage, to the South Pacific, calling at: Hawaii, Tahiti, Fiji, Vanuatu, Solomon Islands, Papua New Guinea, Guam, Okinawa, Shanghai, Osaka, Hawaii.

Crew (2020)

References 

Tall ships of Canada
Sail training associations
Organizations based in Victoria, British Columbia
1974 establishments in British Columbia